Catocala muliercula, the little wife underwing, is a moth of the family Erebidae. The species was first described by Achille Guenée in 1852. It is found in the US from Massachusetts and Connecticut south to Florida and west to Texas and New Mexico.

The wingspan is 54–70 mm. Adults are on wing from May to July depending on the location. There is probably one generation per year.

The larvae feed on Myrica cerifera.

References

External links
Oehlke, Bill. "Catocala muliercula Guenee, 1852". World's Largest Saturniidae Site! Archived May 12, 2008.

Moths described in 1852
muliercula
Moths of North America